The United States Auto Club (USAC) is one of the sanctioning bodies of auto racing in the United States. From 1956 to 1979, USAC sanctioned the United States National Championship, and from 1956 to 1997 the organization sanctioned the Indianapolis 500. Today, USAC serves as the sanctioning body for a number of racing series, including the Silver Crown Series, National Sprint Cars, National Midgets, Speed2 Midget Series, .25 Midget Series, Stadium Super Trucks, and Pirelli World Challenge. Seven-time USAC champion Levi Jones is USAC's Competition Director.

History

When the American Automobile Association (AAA) withdrew from auto racing after the 1955 season, citing the Le Mans disaster and the death of Bill Vukovich at Indianapolis as contributing factors, both the SCCA and NASCAR were mentioned as its potential successor. Ultimately, USAC was formed by Indianapolis Motor Speedway owner Tony Hulman. It became the arbiter of rules, car design, and other matters for what it termed championship auto racing, the highest level of USAC racing. For a while there was a separate series of specifications for championship cars designed to be run on dirt, rather than paved, tracks. Today, USAC sanction open-wheel racing series such as the Silver Crown Series, National Sprint Car Series, National Midget Series, Ignite Ethanol Fuel Series, and Quarter Midgets.

Triple crown
The "triple crown" is earned in USAC racing when a driver claims all three national championships (silver crown, sprint car, and midget car).  Only two drivers, Tony Stewart (1995) and J. J. Yeley (2003), have achieved the triple crown in a single season.  Five other drivers, Pancho Carter (1972–78), Dave Darland (1997–2001), Jerry Coons Jr. (2006–08), Tracy Hines (2000, 2002, 2015), and Chris Windom (2016, 2017, 2020) have claimed each of the three championships at least once in their careers. In 2012 Mike Curb and Cary Agajanian became the only car owners to win the triple crown by winning all three championships in the same year.

National championship
USAC had awarded a national championship until A. J. Foyt won his seventh title in 1979. It has announced that it will begin awarding a national championship starting in 2010. A driver's best 25 finishes  are counted toward the championship and the 2010 winner received $40,000. Points are accumulated in the three national series: sprints, midgets, and silver crown.  Bryan Clauson of Noblesville, Indiana claimed the inaugural championship, topping runner-up Levi Jones by 14 points.

As of 2013 it has been known as the Mike Curb "Super License" National Championship Award.

USAC national drivers champions
2010  – Bryan Clauson; Noblesville, Indiana
2011  – Bryan Clauson; Noblesville, Indiana
2012  – Bryan Clauson; Noblesville, Indiana
2013  - Tracy Hines; New Castle, Indiana
2014  - Tracy Hines; New Castle, Indiana
2015  - Dave Darland; Kokomo, Indiana
2016  - Brady Bacon; Broken Arrow, Oklahoma
2017  - Justin Grant; Ione, California
2018  - Tyler Courtney; Indianapolis, Indiana
2019  - Tyler Courtney; Indianapolis, Indiana
2020  - Chris Windom; Canton, Illinois

1978 plane crash
On April 23, 1978, returning from a race at the Trenton Speedway in New Jersey, eight USAC officials, plus the pilot, were killed when their 10-seat Piper Navajo Chieftain crashed during a thunderstorm 25 miles southeast of Indianapolis.

Killed were:
Ray Marquette, USAC's vice-president of public affairs and a former sportswriter for The Indianapolis Star
Frank Delroy, chairman of USAC technical committee
Shim Malone, starter for USAC races and head of its midget racer division
Judy Phillips, graphic artist and publication director of USAC's newsletter
Stan Worley, chief registrar
Ross Teeguarden, assistant technical chairman
Don Peabody, head of the sprint division
Dr. Bruce White, assistant staff doctor
Don Mullendore, owner and pilot of the plane.

The incident closely followed the death of Indianapolis Motor Speedway owner Tony Hulman.

End of championship car sanctioning

The plane crash came at a time when Indy car owners and drivers were demanding changes from USAC. Aside from the Indianapolis 500, USAC events were not well attended, and the owners felt that USAC poorly negotiated television rights. The owners also wanted increases in payouts, especially at Indy. Though some think the plane crash was used as an opportunistic way to force change in the sport, it was merely an unfortunate coincidence. The seed of dissent had been growing for several years before the accident, and claims the crash was an immediate cause for the 1979 CART/USAC "split" are considered for the most part unfounded.

Also unpopular were the attempts of USAC to keep the aging Offenhauser engine competitive with the newer, and much more expensive, Cosworth DFX engine using boost-limiting "pop off valves" and limiting the amount of fuel that could be used.

Finally, most car owners banded together to form Championship Auto Racing Teams (CART) in 1978, with the first race to be run in 1979. USAC tried unsuccessfully to ban all CART owners from the 1979 Indianapolis 500, finally losing in court before the race began. Both the USAC and CART ran race schedules in 1979.

Indianapolis Motor Speedway president John Cooper was instrumental in forming a joint body of CART and USAC with the creation of the Championship Racing League in March 1980. However, in mid 1980, Cooper forced USAC to renounce their agreement with the CRL if they wanted to keep officiating the Indy 500. After USAC's attempt at a 500-mile races at Pocono Raceway – which was boycotted by the CART teams, forcing USAC to fill the field with silver crown cars – USAC and CART eventually settled into a relatively peaceful co-existence, with USAC continuing to sanction the Indianapolis 500, and CART including the race in its schedule. USAC continued to sanction the Indy 500 until 1997, when the Indy Racing League (itself product of the second American open-wheel split in 1996) terminated the sanctioning agreement following two consecutive scoring errors that year; subsequent Indy 500s were sanctioned by the IRL, currently the IndyCar Series.

Expansion

As of 2022, the United States Auto Club will sanction the three lower rungs of the Road to Indy, the USF Juniors, the USF2000, and Indy Pro 2000 as well as continued sanctioning of the GT World Challenge America and Porsche Sprint Challenge North America under the newly formed Road Racing Division

Active series

USAC Silver Crown Series 

Beginning in 1971, all dirt races were split from the National Championship. From 1971 to 1980, the series was named "National Dirt Car Championship", then renamed "Silver Crown Series" in 1981.

 Champions

 Race winners
* As of the end of the 2022 season

USAC National Sprint Car Championship 

From 1956 to 1960, USAC's National Sprint Car Championship was divided into two regional divisions in the Midwest and the East.

 Champions

 Race winners
* As of the end of the 2020 season

USAC National Midget Championship 

 Champions

 Race winners
* As of the end of the 2020 season

USAC/CRA Sprint Car Series

The USAC/CRA AMSOIL Sprint Car Series debuted in 2004 utilizing the same cars and 410ci engines that race in USAC's AMSOIL National Sprint Car Championship at dirt oval tracks across California and Arizona. The series also features combination races with the AMSOIL USAC Sprint Car National Championship.

Champions

USAC Western States Midget Series 

USAC started the Western States Midgets in 1982 utilizing the same cars & engines that race in the USAC National Midgets. The series solely races on dirt ovals across California and Arizona but in past raced on pavement ovals as well. The series does run co-sanctioned races with USAC's National Midget Series (including the historic Turkey Night Grand Prix race) and the Bay Cities Racing Association Midgets.

Champions

reference:

USAC 360 Sprint Car Series 
USAC sanctions several regional 360 c.i.d. non-wing sprint car series across the country. USAC's West Coast Sprint Car Series was launched in 2009 by Santa Maria Speedway promoter Chris Kearns, and joined forces with USAC in 2010. The West Coast series primarily races at tracks across California while also having special event races in Nevada. USAC's Southwest Sprint Car Series was launched in 1991 as the Arizona Sprint Car Racing Association. The series joined forces with USAC in 2012. The Southwest series primarily races at tracks in Arizona, Nevada and New Mexico while also having special event races in Arkansas, Kansas & Oklahoma. The Southwest series was put on hold after the 2019 season and has not made its way back into the sport since then.

USAC and URC Sprint Caf Series promoter Curt Michael joined forces to create the USAC East Coast Sprint Car Series, with the first season beginning in 2018.

Champions

USAC Speed2 Midget Series 
USAC formed the Speed2 Midget Series (formerly known as the Ford Focus Midget Series, Ignite Midget Series and HPD Midget Series) in 2002 with several regional divisions running across the United States on both dirt & pavement oval tracks. With exception to the engine, the cars used are the same as National & Western States Midget cars. The powerplants currently used are 4-cylinder production-based engines with stock internal dimensions to save costs for competitors. The series started out as a spec engine class, originally with Ford supplying their Zetec engine from 2002 to 2012, and then HPD supplying their K24 engine starting in 2013.

National Championship

The Speed2 Midget Series National Champion has been determined in a variety of ways. The inaugural championship, 2005, was decided by a two-race series (one dirt, one pavement). Subsequent national champions were determined by a single "national championship race" held at various locations. This format was used until 2010. In 2011, a points system was instituted to determine the national champion. Counting only a drivers twelve best finishes, the system allowed drivers from multiple regions to compete under a common points structure for a season-long championship. The 2012 season did not award a national champion, however the respective regional champions were honored at USAC Night of Champions.

National Champions
2005: Robbie Ray; Davenport, IA;
2006: Michael Faccinto; Hanford, CA ; Scelzi #4x
2007: James Robertson; Indianapolis, IN; Steele #1
2008: Alex Bowman; Tucson, AZ; Bowman #55
2009: Kyle Hamilton; Danville, IN; Steele #1
2010: Nick Drake; Mooresville, NC; Cline #55
2011: Nick Drake; Mooresville, NC; Cline #55

Regional Champions

USAC Lightning Sprint National Championship
USAC started the Speedway Motors Lightning Sprint National Championship in 2017 for local tracks running Lightning Sprint cars. The points format counts the 12 best races at USAC sanctioned tracks.

GT World Challenge America

Pirelli World Challenge, was started in 1990 and switched to USAC sanctioning in 2017. The championship currently races on road and street courses across the United States and Canada with seven different classes for GT cars & Touring cars. Founded by WC Vision, the series is presently owned by SRO Group.

Off-road racing

The Stadium Super Trucks series was founded in 2013 by former NASCAR driver Robby Gordon. It is sanctioned by USAC, though Gordon and sponsorship marketing company The Elevation Group co-own the series.

The USAC also sanctions the American Rally Association, Nitro Rallycross, King of the Hammers and Great American Shortcourse.

Former series

USAC Championship Car Series

USAC Gold Crown Series
Starting in 1981, USAC scaled back their participation in Indy car racing outside of the Indianapolis 500. The preeminent national championship season was instead being sanctioned by CART. USAC developed a split-calendar season, beginning in June, and ending in May with the Indy 500. After 1983, however, the Gold Crown schedule would consist of only one event per season (Indy 500), and the Gold Crown title would be regarded largely as ceremonial. The winner of the Indianapolis 500 would be the de facto Gold Crown champion, as it was the lone points-paying event.  The title and the "series" were retired after the 1994–1995 season.

USAC Stock Cars 

USAC featured a stock car division from 1956 to 1984.

* The inaugural season featured two subtitles: Pacific Coast (won by Sam Hanks) and Short Track (Troy Ruttman).

USAC Road Racing Championship

From 1958 until 1962, USAC sanctioned a road racing championship. It was held for sports cars from 1958 to 1961, and adopted Formula Libre rules in 1962.

TORC: The Off-Road Championship

TORC: The Off-Road Championship was founded in 2009 by motocross racer Rick Johnson and it was managed the race operations and officiated the events. USAC took over complete management of the series in 2010. The complete management ended in August 2013 season when it was sold to The Armory. USAC returned to officiation/race control and the series was renamed "TORC: The Off Road Championship" for 2014.
2009 Pro 4x4: Rick Huseman, Pro 2WD: Rob MacCachren
2010 Pro 4x4: Johnny Greaves, Pro 2WD: Ricky Johnson
2011 Pro 4x4: Ricky Johnson, Pro 2WD Bryce Menzies
2012 Pro 4x4: Ricky Johnson, Pro 2WD Bryce Menzies
2013 Pro 4x4: Johnny Greaves, Pro 2WD: Bryce Menzies
2014 Pro 4x4: Johnny Greaves, Pro 2WD: CJ Greaves

References

External links
USACracing.com official website

See also

 Sports Car Club of America
 Automobile Racing Club of America
 Automobile Association of America
 Automobile Club of America

 
Automobile associations in the United States
Open wheel racing
1956 establishments in the United States
Organizations established in 1956

Articles containing video clips